Laura de Witte (born 7 August 1995) is a Dutch sprinter who specializes in the 400 metres. She won the bronze medal in the event at the 2017 European Athletics Under-23 Championships. De Witte earned gold in the women's 4 x 400 m relay at the 2022 European Championships, competing in the heats.

She competed in the 200 metres at the 2016 European Championships.

Her older sister, Lisanne de Witte, is also a 400 metres sprinter.

De Witte's personal bests are: 11.88 seconds in the 100 metres (+0.1 m/s, 2016), 23.23 seconds in the 200 metres (+0.9 m/s, 2016), and 52.15 seconds in the 400 metres (2017).

References

External links

1995 births
Living people
Dutch female sprinters
Athletes (track and field) at the 2016 Summer Olympics
Olympic athletes of the Netherlands
People from Leek, Netherlands
Athletes (track and field) at the 2020 Summer Olympics
Olympic female sprinters
European Athletics Championships winners
Sportspeople from Groningen (province)